Songül is a Turkish given name for females. Notable people with the name include:

 Songül Dikmen (born 1981), Turkish volleyball player
 Songül Öden (born 1979), Turkish stage and television actress

Turkish feminine given names